William K. Houlder (born March 11, 1967) is a Canadian former professional ice hockey defenceman. In his NHL career, Houlder appeared in 846 games.  He tallied 59 goals and added 191 assists.

Playing career
He was drafted by the Washington Capitals in the fourth round, 82nd overall, of the 1985 NHL Entry Draft.

After playing three seasons with the North Bay Centennials of the Ontario Hockey League, Houlder joined the Capitals during the 1987–88 season.  After going back and forth between Washington and their AHL affiliate Baltimore Skipjacks for three seasons, Houlder was traded to the Buffalo Sabres before the 1990–91 season in exchange for Shawn Anderson.

Houlder remained with the Sabres until being selected by the Mighty Ducks of Anaheim in the 1993 NHL Expansion Draft.  Houlder's journeyman status continued for the remainder of his career, as he played just one season for Anaheim before moving on to play with the St. Louis Blues, Tampa Bay Lightning, San Jose Sharks, the Lightning again, and the Nashville Predators.

Houlder retired after the 2002–03 season as a Predator.  In his NHL career, Houlder appeared in 846 games.  He tallied 59 goals and added 191 assists.

Career statistics

Regular season and playoffs

External links

1967 births
Living people
Baltimore Skipjacks players
Buffalo Sabres players
Canadian ice hockey defencemen
Ice hockey people from Ontario
Mighty Ducks of Anaheim players
Nashville Predators players
North Bay Centennials players
Rochester Americans players
St. Louis Blues players
San Diego Gulls (IHL) players
San Jose Sharks players
Sportspeople from Thunder Bay
Tampa Bay Lightning players
Washington Capitals draft picks
Washington Capitals players